Diána Igaly (31 January 1965 – 8 April 2021) was a Hungarian sport shooter who won two Olympic medals in skeet.
She was born in Budapest, where she later died from COVID-19, during the COVID-19 pandemic in Hungary.

Notes

1965 births
2021 deaths
Hungarian female sport shooters
Olympic shooters of Hungary
Skeet shooters
Shooters at the 1992 Summer Olympics
Shooters at the 2000 Summer Olympics
Shooters at the 2004 Summer Olympics
Shooters at the 2008 Summer Olympics
Sport shooters from Budapest
Olympic gold medalists for Hungary
Olympic bronze medalists for Hungary
Olympic medalists in shooting
Medalists at the 2004 Summer Olympics
Medalists at the 2000 Summer Olympics
Deaths from the COVID-19 pandemic in Hungary
21st-century Hungarian women